These are the full results of the 2019 South American Championships in Athletics which took place in Lima, Peru, from 24 to 26 May at the Villa Deportiva Nacional.

Men's results

100 meters

Heats – 24 MayWind:Heat 1: +0.3 m/s, Heat 2: -0.1 m/s

Final – 24 MayWind:-0.9 m/s

200 meters

Heats – 25 MayWind:Heat 1: -0.6 m/s, Heat 2: -0.3 m/s

Final – 26 MayWind:-0.7 m/s

400 meters
24 May

800 meters
26 May

1500 meters
24 May

5000 meters
26 May

10,000 meters
24 May

110 meters hurdles
24 MayWind: -0.8 m/s

400 meters hurdles
25 May

3000 meters steeplechase
25 May

4 × 100 meters relay
25 May

4 × 400 meters relay
26 May

20,000 meters walk
26 May

High jump
24 May

Pole vault
24 May

Long jump
25 May

Triple jump
26 May

Shot put
25 May

Discus throw
25 May

Hammer throw
26 May

Javelin throw
25 May

Decathlon
24–25 May

Women's results

100 meters

Heats – 24 MayWind:Heat 1: -0.1 m/s, Heat 2: -0.1 m/s

Final – 24 MayWind:+0.6 m/s

200 meters

Heats – 25 MayWind:Heat 1: -0.3 m/s, Heat 2: -0.5 m/s

Final – 26 MayWind:+0.8 m/s

400 meters

Heats – 24 May

Final – 24 May

800 meters
26 May

1500 meters
24 May

5000 meters
26 May

10,000 meters
24 May

100 meters hurdles

Heats – 24 MayWind:Heat 1: +0.4 m/s, Heat 2: +0.2 m/s

Final – 24 MayWind:-0.1 m/s

400 meters hurdles
25 May

3000 meters steeplechase
25 May

4 × 100 meters relay
25 May

4 × 400 meters relay
26 May

20,000 meters walk
25 May

High jump
26 May

Pole vault
25 May

Long jump
25 May

Triple jump
24 May

Shot put
26 May

Discus throw
24 May

Hammer throw
25 May

Javelin throw
24 May

Heptathlon
25–26 May

References

South American Championships in Athletics - Results
Events at the South American Championships in Athletics